Stephanie Gandy (born May 10, 1982) is a former British – American female professional basketball player.

Michigan  statistics

Source

External links
Profile at eurobasket.com

References 

1982 births
Living people
Basketball players from Detroit
British women's basketball players
American women's basketball players
Small forwards
Power forwards (basketball)
21st-century American women